The 2012 United States House of Representatives elections in Florida were held on Tuesday, November 6, 2012 to elect the twenty-seven Congressional representatives from the state, one from each of the state's twenty-seven Congressional Districts, a two-seat increase due to the 2010 United States Census. The elections coincided with the elections of other federal and state offices, including a quadrennial presidential election, and a U.S. Senate election. The primary elections were held August 14, 2012.

Redistricting
In November 2010, Florida voters passed two amendments to the Florida Constitution which would require Congressional and state legislative Districts to be compact and follow geographical boundaries, thereby preventing gerrymandering. Shortly after the amendments were passed U.S. Representatives Corrine Brown and Mario Diaz-Balart filed a lawsuit asking that the amendment concerning Congressional Districts be declared invalid. Brown and Diaz-Balart alleged that the power to change rules for congressional redistricting lies exclusively with the state legislature, and as such cannot be changed through a referendum; however in January 2012 a three-judge panel of the 11th U.S. Circuit Court of Appeals rejected their arguments.

Redistricting legislation which would create one new district each in North Florida and Central Florida was passed by a committee of the Florida House of Representatives on January 27, by the full House of Representatives on February 3, and by the Florida Senate on February 9. Shortly after, the Florida Democratic Party announced it would file a lawsuit, alleging that the map violated the Fair Districts provision, which requires that maps do not intentionally favor parties or incumbents. Separately, a coalition of groups including Common Cause, the League of Women Voters and the National Council of La Raza announced it would file its own challenge on the legislation's being signed into law.

Overview 
The table below shows the total number and percentage of votes, as well as the number of seats gained and lost by each political party in the election for the United States House of Representatives in Florida. All vote totals come from the Florida Secretary of State's website along with the individual counties' election department websites.

District 1

Republican Jeff Miller, who has represented Florida's 1st congressional district since 2001, ran for re-election and secured the Republican nomination unopposed. James E. Bryan, an army veteran, secured the Democratic nomination unopposed.

Calen Fretts, the vice chair of the Libertarian Party of Okaloosa County, ran as the Libertarian Party nominee.

Additionally, William Cleave Drummond, II ran for election as a write-in candidate.

Florida's new 1st district voting age population is 77.6%  White (single race), 12.9% Blacks (includes multirace), 4.3% Hispanic (excludes Hispanic Blacks), 0.3% Hispanic Blacks (includes multirace), and 5% other races

General election

Results

District 2

Republican Steve Southerland was first elected to represent Florida's 2nd congressional district in 2010 and secured the Republican nomination unopposed.

Southerland defeated Al Lawson for re-election to a second term 53% 175,856 votes to 47% 157,634 votes out of 333,718 ballots cast on November 6, 2012.
Florida's new 2nd district voting age population is 68.5% non-Hispanic Whites (single race), 23.5% non-Hispanic Blacks (includes multirace), 4.4% Hispanic (excludes Hispanic Blacks), 0.3% Hispanic Blacks (includes multirace), and 3.3% other races (non-Hispanic)

Democratic primary
Candidates
 Leonard Bembry, State representative
 Al Lawson, state senator
 Alvin Peters, attorney and former chairman of the Bay County Democratic Party
 Mark Schlakman

Primary results

General election

Results

District 3

Florida's new 3rd district voting age population is 75.8% non-Hispanic Whites (single race), 12.9% non-Hispanic Blacks (includes multirace), 6.7% Hispanic (excludes Hispanic Blacks), 0.3% Hispanic Blacks (includes multirace), and 4.3% other races (non-Hispanic)

Republican primary
Republican Cliff Stearns, who had represented the 6th District since 1989, had his home in Ocala drawn into the neighboring 11th District.  However, he opted to seek reelection in the 3rd, which contained more than two-thirds of his former territory.  However, he was upset in the primary by Ted Yoho, a large-animal veterinarian from Gainesville.
 Candidates
 James Jett
 Steve Oelrich
 Cliff Stearns, incumbent (FL-06)
 Ted Yoho, veterinarian

Primary results

General election

Results

District 4

Republican Ander Crenshaw, who has represented the 4th District since 2001, won the Republican nomination with 71 percent of the vote.  No other major party put up a candidate.

Florida's new 4th district voting age population is 74.9% non-Hispanic Whites (single race), 12.5% non-Hispanic Blacks (includes multirace), 6.3% Hispanic (excludes Hispanic Blacks), 0.4% Hispanic Blacks (includes multirace), and 5.9% other races (non-Hispanic)

Republican primary

Primary results

General election

Results

District 5

The new 5th district is the successor to the former 3rd district, which has been represented by Democrat Corrine Brown since 1993.

Prior to redistricting, Mike Yost, who unsuccessfully challenged Brown as the Republican nominee in 2010; and LeAnne Kolb had announced plans to run for the Republican nomination, while Gerald Nyren had announced plans to run as a Libertarian Party candidate.

Florida's new 5th district voting age population is 49% non-Hispanic Blacks (includes multirace), 36.2% non-Hispanic Whites (single race), 10% Hispanic (excludes Hispanic Blacks), 1.1% Hispanic Blacks (includes multirace), and 3.7% other races (non-Hispanic)

General election

Results

District 6

In redistricting, most of the old 7th district was renumbered as the new 6th district.  John Mica, who has represented the 7th District since 1993, had his home drawn into the neighboring 7th District, and opted to seek reelection there. 

Florida's new 6th district voting age population is 82.8% non-Hispanic Whites (single race), 8.8% non-Hispanic Blacks (includes multirace), 5.4% Hispanic (excludes Hispanic Blacks), 0.3% Hispanic Blacks (includes multirace), and 2.7% other races (non-Hispanic)

Democratic primary
Candidates
 Heather Beaven, former Navy cryptologist & 2010 Democratic nominee for FL-07
Vipin Verma, attorney,

Primary results

Republican primary
Candidates 
 Richard Clark, member of the Jacksonville City councilmember
 Fred Costello, State representative
 Ron DeSantis, Iraq War veteran and former prosecutor
 William Billy Kogut
 Craig Miller, businessman and Vietnam War veteran 
 Alec Pueschel
 Beverly Slough, chairman of St. Johns County School District Board

Primary results

General election

Results

District 7

The new 7th District is the successor to the old 24th District, represented by Republican Sandy Adams since 2011.  John Mica, who had represented the old 7th District since 1993, had his home drawn into the new 7th. He defeated Adams in the Republican primary with 61 percent of the vote.

Florida's new 7th district voting age population is 70.2% non-Hispanic Whites (single race), 8.1% non-Hispanic blacks (includes multirace), 8.1 percent Hispanic (excludes Hispanic Blacks), 0.9 percent Hispanic Blacks (includes multirace) and 4.7% other races (non-Hispanic).

Democratic primary

Primary results

Republican primary
Candidates
 Sandy Adams, incumbent
 John Mica, incumbent (FL-06)

Primary results

General election

Results

District 8

The new 8th District is the successor to the 15th District, represented by Republican Bill Posey since 2009.  He was unopposed in the Republican primary.  Shannon Roberts won the Democratic nomination, also unopposed.

Florida's new 8th district voting age population is 80.4% non-Hispanic Whites (single race), 8.7% non-Hispanic Blacks (includes multirace), 7.3% Hispanic (excludes Hispanic Blacks), 0.4% Hispanic Blacks (includes multirace), and 3.2% other races (non-Hispanic)

General election

Results

District 9

The new 9th district, an open seat located south of Orlando, is expected to favor Democrats.

Alan Grayson, who formerly represented the 10th district from 2009 to 2011, is seeking to return to the House of Representatives as the representative of the new 9th district. The 9th district will contain all of Osceola County, part of Orange County (including the Orlando International Airport), and part of Polk County. The district's inhabitants voted overwhelmingly for President Barack Obama, preferring him to John McCain 60-39%. In addition, the district will contain a plurality of whites, at 43%, followed by Hispanics and blacks, who will make up 41% and 12% of the population, respectively. Grayson ran unopposed in the Democratic primary and will face Republican nominee Todd Long.

Florida's new 9th district voting age population is 42.9% non-Hispanic Whites (single race), 39.1% Hispanic (excludes Hispanic Blacks), 10.1% non-Hispanic Blacks (includes multirace), 2.3% Hispanic Blacks (includes multirace), and 5.6% other races (non-Hispanic)

Republican primary

Primary results

General election

Results

District 10

In redistricting, the 8th district was renumbered as the 10th district. Republican Daniel Webster, who has represented the 8th district since January 2011, was expected to seek re-election.

Val Demings, a former Chief of the Orlando Police Department and wife of the Orange County Sheriff, ran as a Democrat. Democrat Alan Grayson, who represented the district from 2009 until 2011, said in July 2011 he would run either for the 8th district or for a newly created seat in Orlando.

Florida's new 10th district voting age population is 69.9% non-Hispanic Whites (single race), 13.5% Hispanic (excludes Hispanic Blacks), 10.4% non-Hispanic Blacks (includes multirace), 0.7% Hispanic Blacks (includes multirace), and 5.4% other races (non-Hispanic).

General election

Results

District 11

In redistricting, most of the old 5th District became the 11th District. Rich Nugent, who has represented the 5th since 2011, won reelection in the 11th.  David Werder won the Democratic nomination unopposed.

Florida's new 11th district voting age population is 83.1% non-Hispanic Whites (single race), 7.3% non-Hispanic Blacks (includes multirace), 7% Hispanic (excludes Hispanic Blacks), 0.4% Hispanic Blacks (includes multirace), and 2.2% other races (non-Hispanic)

General election

Results

District 12

In redistricting, most of the old 9th District became the 12th district.  Republican Gus Bilirakis, who has represented the 9th District since 2007, will run for reelection in the 12th.  Jonathan Snow won the Democratic nomination unopposed.

John Russell, an acute care nurse practitioner, had announced prior to redistricting that he would run as an independent in the 11th District.  However, after he was drawn into the 12th, he opted to seek election there.

Florida's new 12th district voting age population is 82.6% non-Hispanic Whites (single race), 9.6% Hispanic (excludes Hispanic Blacks), 4% non-Hispanic Blacks (includes multirace), 0.4% Hispanic Blacks (includes multirace), and 3.5% other races (non-Hispanic)

General election

Results

District 13

In redistricting, most of the old 10th District became the 13th District.  Bill Young, who has represented the 10th and its predecessors since 1971, will run for reelection.

Jessica Ehrlich, who previously worked for U.S. Representatives Clay Shaw and Stephen Lynch, won the Democratic nomination unopposed.

Florida's new 13th district voting age population is 83.5% non-Hispanic Whites (single race), 7% Hispanic (excludes Hispanic Blacks), 5% non-Hispanic Blacks (includes multirace), 0.3% Hispanic Blacks (includes multirace), and 4.2% other races (non-Hispanic)

Republican primary

Primary results

General election

Results

District 14

In redistricting, the 11th District was renumbered as the 14th District.  Democrat Kathy Castor, who has represented the 11th since 2007, will seek reelection here.  E. J. Otero won the Republican nomination.

Florida's new 14th district voting age population is 46.5% non-Hispanic Whites (single race), 24% non-Hispanic Blacks (includes multirace), 24% Hispanic (excludes Hispanic Blacks), 1.6% Hispanic Blacks (includes multirace), and 3.8% other races (non-Hispanic)

Republican primary

Primary results

General election

Results

District 15

In redistricting, the 12th district was renumbered as the 15th district. Dennis Ross, who has represented the 12th district since 2011, won the Republican primary unopposed.  No other party put up a candidate.

Florida's new 15th district voting age population is 68.6% non-Hispanic Whites (single race), 14.2% Hispanic (excludes Hispanic Blacks), 12% non-Hispanic Blacks (includes multirace), 0.7% Hispanic Blacks (includes multirace), and 4.5% other races (non-Hispanic)

District 16

In redistricting, the Florida's 13th congressional district was renumbered as the 16th district.  Republican Vern Buchanan, who has represented the 13th since 2007, will run for reelection in the 16th after deciding against running for the U.S. Senate.

Prior to redistricting, former state representative Keith Fitzgerald had announced he would seek the Democratic nomination to challenge Buchanan.

Florida's new 16th district voting age population is 83.5% non-Hispanic Whites (single race), 8.5% Hispanic (excludes Hispanic Blacks), 5.6% non-Hispanic Blacks (includes multirace), 0.3% Hispanic Blacks (includes multirace), and 2.2% other races (non-Hispanic)

General election

Results

District 17
The new 17th district, an open seat for a large district comprising parts of 10 South and Central Florida counties as well as parts of the Everglades watershed, is expected to favor Republicans.  Republican Tom Rooney, who has represented the 16th district since 2009, will seek re-election in the new 17th district.

Rooney, 41, will run in the general election against a 73-year-old retired Delta Air Lines pilot from Lehigh Acres, Florida, Democrat William Bronson (formerly an unsuccessful Republican candidate in Massachusetts and Georgia) as well as 26-year-old Socialist Workers Party write-in candidate Tom Baumann from Miami (who ran unsuccessful campaigns in Minnesota and in the Borough of Manhattan). As of the September FEC financial reporting deadline Rooney had collected $930,248 in campaign contributions and had $564,716 on hand; the FEC had no reports on Bronson or Baumann.

Florida's new 17th district voting age population is 75.4% non-Hispanic Whites (single race), 13.9% Hispanic (excludes Hispanic Blacks), 7.9% non-Hispanic Blacks (includes multirace), 0.4% Hispanic Blacks (includes multirace), and 2.3% other races (non-Hispanic)
External links

Republican primary
Candidates
 Joe Arnold, member of Okeechobee County school board
 Tom Rooney, incumbent from FL-16

Primary results

General election

Results

District 18
Allen West, who was first elected to represent Florida's 22nd congressional district in 2010, lost his race in the new 18th district. He had won the Republican nomination against Martin County Sheriff Robert Crowder.

Patrick Murphy, an environmental services executive, had planned to seek the Democratic nomination in the 22nd district, but announced in February 2012 that he would continue to challenge West in the 18th district.

Marilyn Davis Holloman qualified to run as a write-in. Everett Wilkinson, the chair of the South Florida Tea Party and registered to vote with no party affiliation, decided not to run.

Florida's new 18th district voting age population is 74.7% non-Hispanic Whites (single race), 11.6% Hispanic (excludes Hispanic Blacks), 10.6% non-Hispanic Blacks (includes multirace), 0.4% Hispanic Blacks (includes multirace), and 2.7% other races (non-Hispanic)

Democratic primary

Primary results

Republican primary

Primary results

General election

Polling

Results

District 19

In redistricting, the 14th district was renumbered as the 19th district. Connie Mack IV, who has represented the 14th district since 2005, will run for the U.S. Senate rather than for re-election.  

James Roach of Cape Coral, a retired GM research engineer and decorated Vietnam combat veteran who ran unsuccessfully for the 14th district in 2010, is the Democratic nominee.

Brandon Smith is on the general election ballot as an independent candidate.

Florida's new 19th district voting age population is 77.1% non-Hispanic Whites (single race), 14.4% Hispanic (excludes Hispanic Blacks), 6% non-Hispanic Blacks (includes multirace), 0.5% Hispanic Blacks (includes multirace), and 2.1% other races (non-Hispanic)

Republican primary
Candidates
Gary Aubuchon, State representative 
Joe Davidow, attorney
Byron Donalds, banker
 Chauncey Goss, son of former Director of Central Intelligence Porter Goss
 Paige Kreegel, State representative 
Trey Radel, conservative radio talk show host

Primary results

General election

Results

District 20

In redistricting, the 23rd District was renumbered as the 20th District.  Democrat Alcee Hastings, who has represented the 23rd since 1993, ran for reelection—in effect, trading district numbers with fellow Democrat Debbie Wasserman Schultz. 

Florida's new 20th district voting age population is 49.2% non-Hispanic Whites (single race), 35.5% Hispanic (excludes Hispanic Blacks), 9.8% non-Hispanic Blacks (includes multirace), 1.2% Hispanic Blacks (includes multirace), and 4.3% other races (non-Hispanic)

General election

Results

District 21

In redistricting, most of the old 19th District became the 21st District.  Ted Deutch, who has represented the 19th district since April 2010, won the Democratic primary.

Cesar Augusto Henao Cañas (born September 10, 1977) is an independent candidate.

Florida's new 21st district voting age population is 66.6% non-Hispanic Whites (single race), 17.6% Hispanic (excludes Hispanic Blacks), 10.6% non-Hispanic Blacks (includes multirace), 0.6% Hispanic Blacks (includes multirace), and 4.5% other races (non-Hispanic)

General election

Results

District 22

Republican Allen West, who was first elected to represent Florida's 22nd congressional district in 2010, sought re-election in the new 18th district. Adam Hasner, a former majority leader of the Florida House of Representatives, sought the Republican nomination in the new 22nd district. Broward County Commissioner Chip LaMarca decided not to run.

Florida's new 22nd district voting age population is 69.4% non-Hispanic Whites (single race), 17.2% Hispanic (excludes Hispanic Blacks), 9.8% non-Hispanic Blacks (includes multirace), 0.6% Hispanic Blacks (includes multirace), and 3.1% other races (non-Hispanic)

Democratic primary
Candidates
 Lois Frankel, former mayor of West Palm Beach, Florida 
 Kristin Jacobs, Broward County Commissioner

Primary results

General election

Results

District 23

In redistricting, the 20th District was renumbered as the 23rd District.  DNC Chairwoman Debbie Wasserman Schultz who has represented the 20th since 2005, is running for re-election. 
Florida's new 23rd district voting age population is 48.9% non-Hispanic Blacks (includes multirace), 29.5% non-Hispanic Whites (single race), 17.4% Hispanic (excludes Hispanic Blacks), 1.2% Hispanic Blacks (includes multirace), and 3.1% other races (non-Hispanic)

Republican primary
Candidates
 Gineen Bresso
 Ozzie deFaria, businessman 
 Karen Harrington, businesswoman and Republican candidate for FL-20 in 2010 
Juan Eliel Garcia
Joseph Kaufman, Americans Against Hate founder

Primary results

General election

Results

District 24

In redistricting, most of the old 17th District was renumbered as the 24th District.  Democrat Frederica Wilson, who had represented the 17th since 2011, sought reelection. Wilson was unopposed in the general election.

Florida's new 24th district voting age population was 51.7% non-Hispanic Blacks (includes multirace), 29.9% Hispanic (excludes Hispanic Blacks), 12.6% non-Hispanic Whites (single race), 3.2% Hispanic Blacks (includes multirace), and 2.5% other races (non-Hispanic)
Frederica Wilson campaign website

Democratic primary
 Candidates
 Rudy Moise, doctor and 2010 candidate in FL-17
 Frederica Wilson, incumbent

Primary results

District 25

In redistricting, the 21st district was renumbered as the 25th district. Republican Mario Diaz-Balart, who has represented the 21st district since 2011, is expected to seek re-election.  No other party put up a candidate.

Florida's new 25th district voting age population is 68.9% Hispanic (excludes Hispanic Blacks), 21.2% non-Hispanic Whites (single race), 6% non-Hispanic Blacks (includes multirace), 1.7% Hispanic Blacks (includes multirace), and 2.1% other races (non-Hispanic)
Mario Diaz-Balart campaign website

General election

Results

District 26

In redistricting, the old 25th District was renumbered as the 26th district.  Republican David Rivera, who has represented the 25th since 2011, will seek reelection. He is running unopposed in the Republican primary.

Attorney, activist, and former Democratic candidate Joe Garcia will run against Rivera in a re-match of the 2010 election. Due to redistricting and constitutional amendments passed in 2010 restricting gerrymandering, the race is considered a toss-up. While the old 25th leaned Republican, the new district is split narrowly in half between Republicans and Democrats.

Florida's new 26th district voting age population is 67.4% Hispanic (excludes Hispanic Blacks), 20.2% non-Hispanic Whites (single race), 8.6% non-Hispanic Blacks (includes multirace), 1.5% Hispanic Blacks (includes multirace), and 2.4% other races (non-Hispanic)

Democratic primary

Primary results

General election

Results

District 27

In redistricting, the old 18th District was renumbered as the 27th District.  Republican Ileana Ros-Lehtinen, who has represented the 18th since 1989, will seek reelection and was unopposed in the Republican primary.  Democrat Manny Yevancey won the Democratic nomination, also unopposed.

Florida's new 27th district voting age population is 72.8% Hispanic (excludes Hispanic Blacks), 17.5% non-Hispanic Whites (single race), 5.5% non-Hispanic Blacks (includes multirace), 2.2% Hispanic Blacks (includes multirace), and 2% other races (non-Hispanic)

General election

Results

References

External links
Florida Division of Elections
Candidate list
United States House of Representatives elections in Florida, 2012 at Ballotpedia
Florida U.S. House from OurCampaigns.com
Campaign contributions for U.S. Congressional races in Florida from OpenSecrets
Outside spending at the Sunlight Foundation
Election 2012: Video candidate interviews, Orlando Sentinel

United States House of Representatives
Florida

2012